Selendi (In Turkish) is a town and district of Manisa Province in the Aegean region of Turkey. According to the 2000 census, population of the district is 26,061 of which 8,095 live in the town of Selendi.

It was located in antiquity on a tributary of the Hermos River.

Ecclesiastical history

The see of Silandus was a suffragan of the see of Sardis. Suppressed under Muslim rule, it was revived as a titular see of the Roman Catholic Church in 1900.

Notes

References

External links
 District municipality's official website 
 Road map of Selendi and environs
 Various images of Selendi, Manisa
 Communication portal of Selendi 

Populated places in Manisa Province
Districts of Manisa Province